Seine-et-Marne is a department in the Île-de-France region in Northern France. Named after the rivers Seine and Marne, it is the region's largest department with an area of 5,915 square kilometres (2,284 square miles); it roughly covers its eastern half. In 2019, it had a population of 1,421,197. Its prefecture is Melun, although both Meaux and Chelles have larger populations.

History
Seine-et-Marne is one of the original 83 departments created on 4 March 1790 during the French Revolution in application of the law of 22 December 1789. It had previously belonged to the former province of Île-de-France.

Geography

Situation

Seine-et-Marne forms a part of the Île-de-France region; the department covers 49% of the region's land area. It is bordered by Val-d'Oise, Seine-Saint-Denis, Val-de-Marne, Essonne to the west; Loiret and Yonne to the south; Aube and Marne to the east; and Aisne and Oise to the north. It is served by RER A, RER B, RER D and RER E amongst other services.

Melun is Seine-et-Marne's prefecture. Fontainebleau, Meaux, Provins and Torcy are its subprefectures. The department comprises part of Paris's outer eastern suburbs; much of Charles de Gaulle Airport sits within its far northwestern boundaries, including a majority of the terminals. The department has many natural reserves, notably Brie and Gâtinais. The department's highest point is butte Saint-George (215 m).

Principal towns

The most populous commune is Meaux; the prefecture Melun is the third-most populous. As of 2019, there are 17 communes with more than 20,000 inhabitants. The 10 most populous communes are:

Climate
Seine-et-Marne has a temperate Atlantic climate.

The storm of 26 December 1999 led to five deaths in Seine-et-Marne and caused several trees to fall.

Demographics 

People from Seine-et-Marne are known as the Seine-et-Marnais.

Originally Seine-et-Marne was very rural and lightly populated. Over the past 50 years, however, its population has tripled, due to the development of the Paris conurbation and the building of new towns in the northwest of the region. The population was estimated to be 1,267,496 inhabitants in 2006. The region has changed from consisting only of small villages to forming a large part of the Paris conurbation.

Seine-et-Marne as a whole shares a sister city relationship with Orlando, Florida, United States, as both host Disney theme parks.

Economy
With 60 percent of the region used as farmland, Seine-et-Marne is where most agricultural activity occurs within Île-de-France. Cereals and sugar beet are the principal exports from Seine-et-Marne.

The other key industrial structures are the refinery at Grandpuits and the Safran Aircraft Engines research plant at Villaroche. The new town of Marne-la-Vallée is the centre of tourism in Seine-et-Marne in terms of number of visitors, mainly due to the Disneyland Park and Walt Disney Studios Park theme parks at Disneyland Paris.

Politics

Presidential elections 2nd round

Departmental Council of Seine-et-Marne
The Departmental Council of Seine-et-Marne has 46 seats. Councillors are elected for six-year terms (no term limits) across the department's 23 cantons (two per canton). Since 2021, Jean-François Parigi of The Republicans (LR) has served as President of the Departmental Council.

National representation

In the National Assembly, Seine-et-Marne is represented by:

In the Senate, Seine-et-Marne is represented by:
 Anne Chain-Larché (The Republicans), since 2015
 Pierre Cuypers (The Republicans), since 2016
 Arnaud de Belenet (La République En Marche!), since 2017
 Vincent Éblé (Socialist Party), since 2011
 Colette Mélot (Agir), since 2004
 Claudine Thomas (The Republicans), since 2017

Tourism

See also
 Cantons of the Seine-et-Marne department
 Communes of the Seine-et-Marne department
 Arrondissements of the Seine-et-Marne department

Bibliography
 Lion, Christian, La Mutuelle de Seine-et-Marne contre l'incendie de 1819 à 1969. Mutualité, assurance et cycles de l'incendie (Bruxelles etc., Peter Lang, 2008).

References

External links

  Prefecture website
  Departmental Council website

 
1790 establishments in France
Departments of Île-de-France
States and territories established in 1790